Herodotia is a genus of flowering plants in the daisy family.

Species
There is only one known species, Herodotia haitiensis, found only in Haiti.

formerly included
now in other genera: Ekmaniopappus, Nesampelos 
 Herodotia alainii J.Jiménez Alm. - Nesampelos alainii (J.Jiménez Alm.) B.Nord.
 Herodotia mikanioides Urb. & Ekman - Ekmaniopappus mikanioides (Urb. & Ekman) Borhidi

References

Senecioneae
Taxa named by Ignatz Urban
Taxa named by Erik Leonard Ekman
Endemic flora of Haiti